Pycnopota is a genus of flies belonging to the family lesser dung flies.

Species
Pycnopota manni Bezzi, 1927 Bolivia

References

Sphaeroceridae
Diptera of South America
Taxa named by Mario Bezzi
Sphaeroceroidea genera